"Hole in the Bottle" (stylized in all lowercase) is a song recorded by American country music artist Kelsea Ballerini. It was released to country radio on May 27, 2020, as the third single from Ballerini's third studio album Kelsea. A remix of the song, featuring fellow country singer Shania Twain was released on November 13, 2020. An alternate recording of the song is also included on Ballerini's first remix album, Ballerini.

Content
Ballerini co-wrote the song with Jesse Frasure, Hillary Lindsey, Ashley Gorley, and Steph Jones. Described as an "upbeat, slightly silly and twangy, yet poppy" drinking song, the song is about getting over a breakup with the help of wine. Ballerini debuted the song at CRS on February 19, 2020 and called it her 'first-ever drinking song.' It was released on February 28, 2020 as a promotional single ahead of the album.

Music video
A lyric video for the song premiered on Ballerini's official YouTube channel on February 27, 2020. The official video for the song premiered on August 31, 2020, and was directed by Hannah Lux Davis. It begins in a vintage black-and-white style with Ballerini dressed in flapper wardrobe reminiscent of the 1920s. Once the first chorus hits, colored scenes are introduced and she is shown in a house painting a portrait of her dog Dibs, in a field with a couple friends who join her in lounging on a bed and perform a dance routine with the singer, and playing chess with herself.

Charts

Weekly charts

Year-end charts

Certifications

References

2020 songs
2020 singles
Kelsea Ballerini songs
Shania Twain songs
Black River Entertainment singles
Female vocal duets
Music videos directed by Hannah Lux Davis
Songs written by Kelsea Ballerini
Songs written by Jesse Frasure
Songs written by Hillary Lindsey
Songs written by Ashley Gorley
Songs written by Steph Jones
Black-and-white music videos